George Albert Owens (February 9, 1919 - December 21, 2003) was the 9th president of Tougaloo College in Mississippi serving from 1966 to 1984. He was the college's first African American president. He succeeded Adam D. Beittel who was removed from office after supporting civil rights activists. While in office he increased funding and campus housing.

He was born in Bolton, Mississippi on February 9, 1919 to sharecropping parents and he graduated from Jackson College High School. He graduated from Tougaloo and Columbia University. He had captained the school's football team. He worked as its business manager.

The New York Times quoted him in a story about the college in 1970 saying "Institutions like ours have the responsibility to identify the strengths of our students".
His wife's name was Ruth and she died before him. The college's gymnasium was named for them. U.S. Surgeon General Jerome Adams visited the health and wellness center named for him on the occasion of its 20th anniversary.

He received threats as college president, as well as other staff, and his home on the college campus was bombed.

Owens died on December 21, 2003 after suffering with Parkinson's disease. His two children survived him.

Further reading
Inauguration of George A. Owens as President of Tougaloo College, April 21, 1966
By Tougaloo College, Tougaloo, Mississippi 1966

References

1919 births
2003 deaths
Heads of universities and colleges in the United States
People from Bolton, Mississippi
American educators